Tripolis (meaning "three cities") was a district in ancient Perrhaebia, Thessaly, Greece, containing the three cities of Azorus, Pythion (Pythium), and Doliche. (Livy, xlii. 53.)

References

Geography of ancient Thessaly
Perrhaebia